The Best of Buffy Sainte-Marie is a compilation album taken from her first six albums with Vanguard Records, released in 1970.

History
Issued as a double-LP set after the financial disaster of Illuminations, the album contains material from all her previous albums but not one track unavailable elsewhere at the time of its release. The compilation was a very modest chart success, returning her to the Top 200 after the failure of Illuminations, from which it does however extract five tracks.

Because Many a Mile has been issued on compact disc only in Italy, and Illuminations and Fire & Fleet & Candlelight were not issued on CD until many years after The Best of Buffy Sainte-Marie became her first-ever release on CD in 1990, the compilation has always been of considerable value despite containing no hits except the extremely minor #98 "I'm Gonna Be a Country Girl Again" (which actually only reached even that position after being re-released after "Soldier Blue"). An abbreviated single-LP  version was also released in 1972 with the catalogue number Vanguard 73113.

Track list

Charts
Billboard (North America)

References

Best of Buffy Sainte-Marie, The
Best of Buffy Sainte-Marie, The
Best of Buffy Sainte-Marie, The
Best of Buffy Sainte-Marie, The